Cristopher J. Clancy (born September 9, 1924–June 11, 1988), better known as Mike Clancy, was an American professional wrestler, sheriff and businessman. Clancy became a prominent performer throughout the National Wrestling Alliance from 1948 to 1967, capturing the NWA World Junior Heavyweight Championship and having feuds with Lou Thesz, Verne Gagne and Freddie Blassie.

Early life
Born to John and Mary Clancy in 1924, Clancy attended Warren Academy and wrestled as an amateur in his youth. During World War II Clancy served in the United States Coast Guard. He began his professional wrestling career in 1945 at the close of the war.

Professional wrestling career
Clancy competed throughout the United States from 1945. He became a mainstay for various National Wrestling Alliance promotions over the next decade and on April 10, 1956, he captured his first world title by defeating Ed Francis for the NWA World Junior Heavyweight Championship. Clancy lost the title for the final time against Angelo Savoldi in 1958. Clancy defeated Jackie Fargo for the NWA Southern Junior Heavyweight Championship in December 1959 and also won the NWA World Tag Team Championship with Oni Wiki and the United States Tag Team Championship with Al Lovelock.

During one match, he was 'attacked' by Mr. Moto outside the ring with a shoe. Moto was a native of Hawaii but was billed from Japan, whom the United States had only recently accepted surrender from, ending World War II. One fan became so enraged at the 'attack' that he took out a knife and indicted to a security guard called Billy Jack that he intended to "kill the bad guy". Jack, who was armed, told the fan that he disliked Moto also and told him to do it. As the fan approached the ring, Jack disarmed him from behind and stopped the potential assault.

Post-wrestling and retirement
Clancy retired from professional wrestling in 1967 and relocated to Tulsa, Oklahoma where he became the owner of "Clancy's Pizza Parlor" and county Sheriff. He died on June 11, 1988 in Tulsa.

Championships and accomplishments 
Mid-Atlantic Championship Wrestling
 NWA Mid-Atlantic Tag Team Championship (3 times)	

National Wrestling Alliance
 NWA World Junior Heavyweight Championship
 NWA World Tag Team Championship

NWA Mid-America
 AWA Southern Tag Team Championship (2 times)	
 NWA Southern Junior Heavyweight Championship

References

External links 
 
 

1924 births
1988 deaths
American male professional wrestlers
Oklahoma sheriffs
People from Woburn, Massachusetts
Professional wrestlers from Massachusetts
United States Coast Guard personnel of World War II
NWA World Junior Heavyweight Champions
20th-century professional wrestlers